Roseomonas pecuniae is a species of Gram negative, strictly aerobic, coccobacilli-shaped, pinkish-red-colored bacterium. It was first isolated from the surface of a 50 Euro cent copper-alloy
coin, and the species was first proposed in 2011. The species name comes from Latin pecuniae (of/from money or a coin).

The optimum growth temperature for R. pecuniae is 30 °C, but can grow in the 10-35 °C range. The optimum pH is 7.0.

References

External links 

Type strain of Roseomonas pecuniae at BacDive -  the Bacterial Diversity Metadatabase

Rhodospirillales
Bacteria described in 2011